Francesco Mallegni (born 14 February 1940; Camaiore) is an Italian paleoanthropologist, author of forensic facial reconstructions of several Italian Medieval persons.

Mallegni was an assistant in 1973, promoted to associate in 1980, and since 2002 works as professor of paleoanthropology at the Department of Archaeological Sciences in Pisa and Siena.

Research
In 2002 Francesco Mallegni conducted DNA testing on the recently excavated bodies of the Ugolino and his children. His analysis agrees with the remains being a father, his sons and his grandsons. Additional comparison to DNA from modern day members of the Della Gherardesca family leave Mallegni about 98 percent sure that he has identified the remains correctly. However, the forensic analysis discredits the allegation of cannibalism. Analysis of the rib bones of the Ugolino skeleton reveals traces of magnesium, but no zinc, implying he had consumed no meat in the months before his death. Ugolino also had few remaining teeth and is believed to have been in his 70s when he was imprisoned, making it further unlikely that he could have outlived and eaten his descendants in captivity. Additionally, Mallegni notes that the putative Ugolino skull was damaged; perhaps he did not ultimately die of starvation, although malnourishment is evident.

During an excavation in the 1970s bones were discovered beneath the paving of Santa Reparata at a spot close to the location given by Vasari, but unmarked on either level. Forensic examination of the bones by Francesco Mallegni and a team of experts in 2000 brought to light some facts that seemed to confirm that they were those of an Italian painter Giotto, particularly the range of chemicals, including arsenic and lead, both commonly found in paint, that the bones had absorbed.

In 2005, Francesco Mallegni along with Giacomo Michelini had studied the corpse of Pope Gregory VII which laid undisturbed since 1975. In 2007, Francesco Mallegni gave Dante's image a new 3D look. The new face shows softer traits: large eyes, a rounded jaw and a gentler expression, although the nose remains crooked. The multidisciplinary project to reconstruct Dante's face lasted about two months, using a plaster model of the skull and 3D computer technology and other techniques to simulate muscles and skin.
Mona Lisa
Saint Homobonus
Andrea Mantegna
Vespasiano Gonzaga
Luigi Boccherini

Books
I neandertalini. Comparsa e scomparsa di una specie by David Caramelli, Francesco Mallegni Brunetto Chiarelli (Jan 1, 2009)
Memorie dal sottosuolo e dintorni. Metodologie per un «recupero e trattamenti adeguati» dei resti umani erratici e da sepolture by Francesco Mallegni (Jan 1, 2005)
Il conte Ugolino di Donoratico tra antropologia e storia by M. Luisa Ceccarelli Lemut Francesco Mallegni (Jan 1, 2003)

Links
unipi.academia.edu

References

21st-century scientists
Italian paleontologists
University of Pisa alumni
Living people
Paleoanthropologists
1940 births
People from the Province of Lucca